The Charter Tower is a Grade II* listed building in Gadebridge Park, Hemel Hempstead, Hertfordshire, England. The two-storey tower, built of ashlar, is the entranceway and all that remains of the former manor house of Sir Richard Combe, and his arms may still be seen on the tower.

References

External links

Grade II* listed buildings in Hertfordshire
Buildings and structures in Hemel Hempstead
Towers in Hertfordshire
Buildings and structures completed in the 16th century